John Francis "Jess" Cortazzo (September 26, 1904 – March 4, 1963) also known as Shine was a professional baseball player.  He was a shortstop for one season (1923) with the Chicago White Sox.  For his career, he appeared in one game and was retired in his only at bat.

He was born in Wilmerding, Pennsylvania and died in Pittsburgh, Pennsylvania at the age of 58.

External links

1904 births
1963 deaths
People from Wilmerding, Pennsylvania
American people of Italian descent
Baseball players from Pennsylvania
Major League Baseball shortstops
Chicago White Sox players
Birmingham Barons players
Canton Terriers players
Dayton Ducks players
Cumberland Colts players
Johnstown Johnnies players
Muskegon Anglers players
Minneapolis Millers (baseball) players
Memphis Chickasaws players
Mount Airy Graniteers players
Nashville Vols players
Portsmouth Pirates players
Toledo Mud Hens players
Zanesville Greys players